Chen Greif is a professor and former department head of computer science at the University of British Columbia. In March 2022 he was elected a fellow of the Society for Industrial and Applied Mathematics for "contributions to scientific computing, especially in numerical linear algebra and its applications."

Education 
Greif attended Tel Aviv University, earning a bachelor's degree 1991 and a master's degree in 1994 in mathematics. He continued his education at the University of British Columbia, where he was awarded a PhD in Applied Mathematics in 1998. He was also a postdoctoral fellow at Stanford University from 1998 to 2000.

Research 
His research is primarily concerning scientific computing and more specifically:
 Matrix theory and analysis
 Iterative solvers and preconditioning techniques for sparse linear systems
 Saddle-point linear systems
 Numerical solution of elliptic partial differential equations
 Linear algebra aspects of constrained optimization problems

Selected publication

Books 
 Ascher UM, Greif C, editors. A first course in numerical methods. Society for Industrial and Applied Mathematics; 2011 June 22. Cited 166 times in Google Scholar

Artuckes 
 Golub GH, Greif C. On solving block-structured indefinite linear systems. SIAM Journal on Scientific Computing. 2003;24(6):2076-92. Cited 181 times in Google Scholar
 Avron H, Sharf A, Greif C, Cohen-Or D. ℓ1-sparse reconstruction of sharp point set surfaces. ACM Transactions on Graphics (TOG). 2010 Nov 5;29(5):1-2. Cited 145 times in Google Scholar
 Golub GH, Greif C. An Arnoldi-type algorithm for computing page rank. BIT Numerical Mathematics. 2006 Dec 1;46(4):759-71. Cited 121 times in Google Scholar
 Greif C, Schötzau D. Preconditioners for the discretized time‐harmonic Maxwell equations in mixed form. Numerical Linear Algebra with Applications. 2007 May;14(4):281-97.Cited 114 times in Google Scholar

References

External links 
 Faculty website

Israeli expatriates in Canada
Living people
Fellows of the Society for Industrial and Applied Mathematics
Academic staff of the University of British Columbia
Tel Aviv University alumni
University of British Columbia alumni
Israeli computer scientists
1965 births